Battleborn (2012) is a short story collection by American author Claire Vaye Watkins.

Contents

Synopsis

"Ghosts, Cowboys"

A semi-autobiographical narrator tells the story of her father Paul Watkins and his role in the Manson Family.

Additionally, the story details how George Spahn acquired his ranch and the narrator's bond with her half-sister dubbed Razor Blade Baby.

Awards and honors
2013 The Story Prize winner Battleborn
2013 Dylan Thomas Prize winner Battleborn
2013 American Academy of Arts and Letters Rosenthal Family Foundation Awards winner Battleborn
2013 Andrew Carnegie Medals for Excellence in Fiction longlist Battleborn
2013 Frank O'Connor International Short Story Award shortlist Battleborn

Bibliography

References

2012 short story collections
Riverhead Books books
Granta Books books